Cassinia compacta is a species of flowering plant in the family Asteraceae and is endemic to eastern Australia. It is a shrub with densely hairy stems, linear leaves and heads of yellow flowers arranged in dense corymbs.

Description

Taxonomy
Cassinia compacta was first formally described in 1858 by Ferdinand von Mueller in Fragmenta phytographiae Australiae from specimens collected by Walter Hill on Mount Lindesay at a height of "".

Distribution and habitat
This cassinia grows in woodland and forest in north from Fitzroy Falls in New South Wales and in south-east Queensland.

References

compacta
Asterales of Australia
Flora of New South Wales
Flora of Queensland
Taxa named by Ferdinand von Mueller
Plants described in 1858